Üge Qaghan (烏介可汗) — was the twelfth ruler of Uyghurs. His Uyghur name was probably Üge.
Manichaeans

Life 
He was a younger brother of Zhaoli Qaghan and an uncle of Zhangxin Qaghan. He claimed the qaghanal title after the Yenisei Kyrgyz invasion in 841, with the support of 13 tribes. One of his first acts was to ambush the Kyrgyz escort who was guarding Princess Taihe. After capture, he had her write to Emperor Wuzong, requesting for Emperor Wuzong to recognize him as the new qaghan. He also asked for the emperor to lend him the border city of Zhenwu (振武, in modern Hohhot, Inner Mongolia), in order to allow him to plan the rebuilding of the Uighur Khaganate. Emperor Wuzong responded with an edict that instructed the qaghan to remain outside Tang borders. He also requested Princess Taihe to personally return to Chang'an to report on the Uighurs' status. Among his requests, he demanded security for Manichean temples in China, retrieval of Wamosi and troops for aid.

Qaghan did not follow Emperor Wuzong's orders and pillaged Tang's northern territory in earnest. He also made another request to borrow the border city of Tiande (天德, in modern Bayan Nur, Inner Mongolia), which Emperor Wuzong rejected. Emperor Wuzong further wrote a rebuking letter to qaghan and warning of consequences, again ordering him to have Princess Taihe personally report and make requests. Emperor Wuzong also mobilized the forces of the circuits on the northern border, preparing a major retributive campaign against Uighurs. In winter 842, he also had the chancellor Li Deyu write a letter in his own name, addressed to Princess Taihe, sending it to the Uyghurs remnants along with winter clothes as a gift for Princess Taihe. Also in 842, at Li Deyu's advice, Emperor Wuzong ordered Tiande's commander Tian Mou (田牟) to stop engaging the Uyghurs, but instead entice them with food supplies and send them to Hedong Circuit (河東, headquartered in modern Taiyuan, Shanxi). Also under Li Deyu's recommendation, the general Shi Xiong was sent to Tiande to assist Tian in defending against Uyghur raids.

In February 843, qaghan launched an attack on Zhenwu. Tang forces, commanded by the general Shi Xiong and Zhuye Chixin, prepared a surprise counter-attack. Li Sizhong also subsequently volunteered to fight the Uyghur remnants along with soldiers from the Qibi (契苾), Shatuo, and Tuyuhun tribesmen; in response, Emperor Wuzong ordered two prefects, He Qingchao (何清朝) and Qibi Tong (契苾通), to report to him with 6000 troops each. When Shi Xiong arrived near the Uyghur camp, he noticed that there were some special wagons lined with rugs and that the servants in those wagons were wearing red and green-colored robes that appeared to be Chinese. He sent a scout named Cai Xi to make contact and found out that these were Princess Taihe's train. He then had the scout again inform Princess Taihe of his plans to attack and asked her and her servants to remain calm and not move during the attack. At night, he made a surprise attack on qaghan's tent and his forces collapsed on 13 February 843. Wujie fled, and Shi then escorted Princess Taihe back to Tang territory.

Death and succession 
He fled to Heichezi (黑车子), a Shiwei tribe at first. His defeat also meant a ban on Manichaeism in China. However he was still active for next 3 years fleeing from Kyrgyz and Tang. He later died in 846 in a battle near Altai Mountains or perhaps assassinated by one of Wamosi's man. He was succeeded by his younger brother Enian Qaghan.

References 

846 deaths
Ädiz clan
9th-century monarchs in Asia
9th-century Turkic people
Monarchs killed in action